This is a list of schools in Herefordshire, England.

State-funded schools

Primary schools

Almeley Primary School, Almeley
Ashfield Park Primary School, Ross-on-Wye
Ashperton Primary Academy, Ashperton
Bosbury CE Primary School, Bosbury
Brampton Abbotts CE Primary School, Brampton Abbotts
Bredenbury Primary School, Bredenbury
Bridstow CE Primary School, Bridstow
Broadlands Primary School, Hereford
Brockhampton Primary School, Brockhampton
Burghill Community Academy, Burghill
Burley Gate CE Primary School, Burley Gate
Canon Pyon CE Primary School, Canon Pyon
Clehonger CE Primary School, Clehonger
Clifford Primary School, Clifford
Colwall CE Primary School, Colwall
Cradley CE Primary School, Cradley
Eardisley CE Primary School, Eardisley
Eastnor Parochial Primary School, Eastnor
Ewyas Harold Primary School, Ewyas Harold
Garway Primary School, Garway
Goodrich CE Primary School, Goodrich
Gorsley Goffs Primary School, Gorsley
Hampton Dene Primary School, Hereford
Holmer CE Academy, Holmer
Ivington CE Primary School, Ivington
Kimbolton St James CE Primary School, Kimbolton
King's Caple Primary Academy, King's Caple
Kingsland CE Primary School, Kingsland
Kingstone and Thruxton Primary School, Kingstone
Kington Primary School, Kington
Lea CE Primary School, Lea
Ledbury Primary School, Ledbury
Leintwardine Endowed CE Primary School, Leintwardine
Leominster Primary School, Leominster
Little Dewchurch CE Primary School, Little Dewchurch
Llangrove CE Academy, Llangrove
Longtown Community Primary School, Longtown
Lord Scudamore Primary Academy, Hereford
Lugwardine Primary Academy, Lugwardine
Luston Primary School, Luston
Madley Primary School, Madley
Marden Primary Academy, Marden
Marlbrook Primary School, Hereford
Michaelchurch Escley Primary School, Michaelchurch Escley
Mordiford CE Primary School, Mordiford
Much Birch CE Primary School, Much Birch
Much Marcle CE Primary School, Much Marcle
Orleton CE Primary School, Orleton
Our Lady's RC Primary School, Hereford
Pembridge CE Primary School, Pembridge
Pencombe CE Primary School, Pencombe
Peterchurch Primary School, Peterchurch
Riverside Primary School, Hereford
St Francis Xavier's Primary School, Hereford
St James' CE Primary School, Hereford
St Joseph's RC Primary School, Ross-on-Wye
St Martin's Primary School, Hereford
St Mary's CE Primary School, Credenhill
St Mary's CE Primary School, Fownhope
St Mary's Primary School, Dilwyn
St Michael's CE Primary School, Bodenham
St Paul's CE Primary School, Hereford
St Peter's Primary School, Bromyard
St Thomas Cantilupe CE Academy, Hereford
St Weonards Academy, St Weonards
Shobdon Primary School, Shobdon
Staunton-on-Wye Endowed Primary School, Staunton on Wye
Steiner Academy Hereford, Much Dewchurch
Stoke Prior Primary School, Stoke Prior
Stretton Sugwas CE Academy, Stretton Sugwas
Sutton Primary Academy, Sutton St Nicholas
Trinity Primary School, Hereford
Walford Primary School, Walford
Wellington Primary School, Wellington
Weobley Primary School, Weobley
Weston-under-Penyard CE Primary School, Weston under Penyard
Whitchurch CE Primary School, Whitchurch
Wigmore Primary School, Wigmore
Withington Primary School, Withington

Secondary schools

Aylestone School, Hereford
Bishop of Hereford's Bluecoat School, Hereford
Earl Mortimer College, Leominster
Fairfield High School, Peterchurch
The Hereford Academy, Hereford
John Kyrle High School, Ross-on-Wye
John Masefield High School, Ledbury
Kingstone High School, Kingstone
Lady Hawkins' School, Kington
Queen Elizabeth High School, Bromyard
St Mary's RC High School, Lugwardine
Steiner Academy Hereford, Much Dewchurch
Weobley High School, Weobley
Whitecross Hereford High School, Hereford
Wigmore High School, Wigmore

Special and alternative schools
Barrs Court School, Hereford
The Beacon College, Hereford
Blackmarston School, Hereford
The Brookfield School, Hereford
Herefordshire Pupil Referral Service, Hereford
Westfield School, Leominster

Further education
Hereford College of Arts
Hereford Sixth Form College
Herefordshire and Ludlow College
Royal National College for the Blind

Independent schools

Primary and preparatory schools
The Downs School, Colwall
The Elms School, Colwall
Hereford Cathedral Junior School, Hereford

Senior and all-through schools
Hereford Cathedral School, Hereford
Lucton School, Lucton

Special and alternative schools
Cambian Hereford School, Leominster
Compass Community School Hereford, Fromes Hill
Hidelow Grange School, Acton Green
Queenswood School, Ledbury
Rowden House School, Bromyard

Herefordshire
Schools in Herefordshire
Schools